Tso Tang (Historically Tso Thang;) is an alkaline lake located in the disputed territory of Aksai Chin in Hotan Prefecture of Xinjiang province of China.

History 
In the late 1800s, in order to facilitate trade between the Indian subcontinent and Tarim Basin, the British attempted to promote a caravan route via the Chang Chenmo Valley as an alternative to the difficult and tariffed Karakoram Pass. Tso Tang was on this route. British Army surgeon Henry Cayley who was part a mission to Yarkand that took this route noted the lake as "brackish but quite potable."

References 

Lakes of Ladakh
Geography of Xinjiang
Hotan Prefecture
Territorial disputes of China
Territorial disputes of India
Aksai Chin